VE or ve may refer to:

Businesses and brands
 EUjet (2003-2005, IATA airline designator VE)
 Avensa (1943-2004, IATA airline designator VE)
 Valley Entertainment, a U.S. record label and music distributor
 Visalia Electric Railroad (reporting mark VE)
 Volare Airlines (1997-2009, IATA airline designator VE)
 Holden VE Commodore, a model of the Holden Commodore, a car produced by GM Australia
 Ve Global (also known as Ve)

Language
 Ve (Cyrillic), a character from the Cyrillic alphabet, resembling B
 Ve (Arabic), a character of the Arabic alphabet
 Vè, a Vietnamese poetic form
 Ve, a proposed gender-neutral pronoun
 ve, a contraction of the English auxiliary verb "have"
 Venda language (ISO 639 alpha-2 code "ve")

Places
Ve, Norway, a village in Kristiansand municipality, Vest-Agder county, Norway

Science and technology

Biology and medicine
 Minute ventilation (VE), of the lungs
 VE (nerve agent), by NATO designation, a chemical weapon agent
 Viliuisk Encephalomyelitis
 Viral eukaryogenesis
 Voluntary euthanasia

Computing
 .ve, the Internet TLD for Venezuela
 Virtual environment, a primary component of a Virtual Reality system
 Virtual Earth, former name of Microsoft's Bing Maps Platform
 VisualEditor, a MediaWiki editor developed for Wikipedia

Other uses in science and technology
 Value engineering, a method to improve the "value" of products and services by examination of function
 Vinyl ester resin, a resin
 Volcanic Explosivity Index
 Volumetric efficiency
 VE, voltage relative to the ground ("Earth")

Other uses
VE, reincarnation of the seventh Seraphim
 Vili and Vé, gods in Norse mythology
 Vé (shrine), a shrine in Germanic paganism and modern place name element
 Venezuela (ISO, FIPS 10-4, and NATO (obsolete) country code VE)
 Victory in Europe Day, or V-E Day
 Viva Emptiness, a music album by Katatonia
 Vertical exaggeration, a vertical scaling used in technical diagrams
 Vocational expert, an authority in the areas of vocational rehabilitation